The Shaggy Dog is a 2006 American science fantasy family comedy film directed by Brian Robbins and written by The Wibberleys, Geoff Rodkey, Jack Amiel, and Michael Begler. It is a remake of the 1959 film of the same name and its 1976 sequel, The Shaggy D.A., both loosely based on the 1923 novel The Hound of Florence by Felix Salten. The original film had a character named Wilby Daniels transforming into an Old English Sheepdog after putting on a magic ring, whereas the remake presents a character named Dave Douglas transforming into a Bearded Collie after getting bitten by a sacred dog. It stars Tim Allen, Robert Downey Jr., Kristin Davis, Danny Glover, Spencer Breslin, Jane Curtin, Zena Grey and Philip Baker Hall.

The Shaggy Dog was released on March 10, 2006 by Walt Disney Pictures. It received negative reviews from critics and grossed $87 million against its $50 million budget, becoming a box office flop.

Plot
Dave Douglas is a deputy district attorney in Los Angeles County who is prosecuting social studies teacher and activist Justin Forrester for firebombing the pharmaceutical corporation Grant and Strictland. Forrester denies this, but claims that Grant and Strictland have been engaging in illegal animal experimentation. This distances Dave from his daughter Carly, one of Forrester's students. As Dave is also a workaholic, his relationships with his wife Rebecca and son Josh are strained.

The greedy geneticists working for Mr. Lance Strictland, led by Dr. Kozak, have stolen a 300-year-old sacred dog named Khyi Yang Po (a Bearded Collie) from a Tibetan monastery. The scientists determine that Khyi Yang Po's genetic sequence, when isolated and put into a vaccination, invades and alters the cells and DNA of a victim.

Carly brings Khyi Yang Po, who she calls 'Shaggy', home. When Dave returns from work, he takes Khyi Yang Po out in the garage, then the dog runs to get the newspaper. Khyi Yang Po gives him his newspaper, and Dave reaches for it, only to be bitten on the hand by Khyi Yang Po. Khyi Yang Po's saliva and cells infect Dave and is taken to be tested for rabies and the tests came back negative. Over the next few days, Dave realizes that he uncontrollably transforms into a sheep dog exactly like Khyi Yang Po when prompted by distractions and activities typical of a dog, such as a stick thrown through the air and chasing cats. These transformations can be reversed by sleeping, but Dave's human absence from his family further strains his relationships. During this time, his family, unaware of Dave's condition, continue housing Dave as a dog, thinking it's Khyi Yang Po. Dave slowly learns just how little he understands his kids and wife and resolves to make amends.

In the ongoing trial, Forrester testifies seeing the animals behaving like dogs and the presence of a bearded collie he identifies as a giant sheepdog, which sparks Dave's suspicions about Grant and Strictland. When his dog-like behavior annoys the judge, Dave is removed from the case. Seeking answers to his transformation, Dave heads to Grant and Strictland. He has a homeless man help him transform so that he may sneak in through a vent. Hidden in the laboratory, Dave witnesses Dr. Kozak injecting company president Lance Strictland with a drug that will paralyze him for several months, giving Kozak enough time to usurp control of the company. After viewing security cameras, Kozak and his minions realize that Dave is capable of transforming into a copy of Khyi Yang Po.

When Dave returns home, still in his canine form, he overhears a conversation between Carly and Josh that he and Rebecca may be splitting up. After hearing this, Dave then knocks over a Scrabble game and uses the letters to reveal his identity to his kids. But when Dave gets out of the house, he is tased by Kozak's minions. His kids attempt to save him, but end up picking up the real Khyi Yang Po instead and rush to their mom at work to report recent events.

Dave is taken to the laboratory to be euthanized, but Kozak has a court summons, and must deal with Dave later. Right before he exits, Kozak mocks Dave in canine form and Dave bites him in response. The other mutated animals in the laboratory tell Dave to meditate to reverse his transformation. Dave succeeds in returning to human form, and is able to escape with all of the other animals. He drives to the courthouse and calls his wife to ready a change of clothes for him at the courthouse, but is forced to abandon the car with the animals when they get stuck in traffic. Dave runs on all fours to trigger his transformation to get to the courthouse in time. At the courthouse entrance, his attempts to tell his wife that he loves her allows him to transform back.

In the courtroom, Dave calls Kozak back to the stand and tries to get him to admit what he has done, but Kozak manages to hide his secret. Thinking quickly, he mocks Kozak by implying he was working under Strictland's shadow, and angers him. The two begin growling at each other, and the judge, exasperated by Dave's canine behavior, orders the bailiff to remove him. Dave grabs the baliff's baton and tells Kozak to fetch, triggering a partial transformation in him and thus implicating him of illegal and unethical experimentation. The pharmaceutical company is returned to Strictland, the mutant animals enter protective custody, and Dave finally makes amends with his family.

An epilogue shows the family vacationing in Hawaii with Khyi Yang Po. Josh tells his dad to fetch a frisbee he just tossed, and Dave catches it with his mouth.

Cast

 Tim Allen as David "Dave" Douglas / The Shaggy Dog
 Robert Downey Jr. as Dr. Kozak
 Kristin Davis as Rebecca Douglas
 Danny Glover as Kenneth "Ken" Hollister
 Philip Baker Hall as Dr. Lance Strictland 
 Zena Grey as Carly Douglas
 Spencer Breslin as Joshua "Josh" Douglas
 Bess Wohl as Dr. Gwen Lichtman
 Jordyn Colemon as Tracy 
 Jarrad Paul as Larry
 Jane Curtin as Judge Claire Whittaker
 Rhea Seehorn as Lori
 Shawn Pyfrom as Trey
 Cole as Khyi Yang Po/The Shaggy Dog
 Martin Sru as Bin Bag
 Joel Moore as a dog pound employee
 Crystal the Monkey as Monkey
 Jane Hajduk as a news reporter
 Adam Hicks as a quarterback

Release
The film was released in the United States on March 10, 2006. To tie-in with the theatrical release of the remake, the original 1959 film was re-issued in the United States as a special DVD labeled "The Wild & Woolly Edition", which featured the film in two forms: one in the original black and white, the other a colorized version. The colorized version, however, is not restored and suffers from age. In the UK, the 1959 film has only ever been made available on DVD in black and white.

Reception

Box office
The Shaggy Dog grossed $61.1 million in the United States $26 million in other territories for a worldwide total of $87.1 million, against its budget of $60 million.

In its opening weekend the film made $16.3 million, finishing second at the box office behind Failure to Launch ($24.4 million).

Critical response
On Rotten Tomatoes, the film has an approval rating of 26% based on 105 reviews and an average rating of 4.4/10. The site's critical consensus reads: "This Disney retread has neither inspiration nor originality, but may please moviegoers under the age of ten". On Metacritic, the film has a score of 43 out of 100 based on 25 critics, indicating "mixed or average reviews". Audiences polled by CinemaScore gave the film an average grade of "B+" on an A+ to F scale.

BBC called Allen uninteresting and said he "only stops short of leg-humping in his attempts to win our affections". At the Razzie Awards, the film earned three nominations, Worst Actor for Tim Allen, Worst Remake or Rip-Off and Worst Excuse for Family Entertainment, but failed to "win" any of those categories. Variety Chief Film Critic Justin Chang noted that "its occasional lump-in-the-throat moments are almost effortlessly achieved, thanks to strong work from [Kristin] Davis and Spencer Breslin in particular".

Soundtrack
The soundtrack to The Shaggy Dog was released on March 14, 2006. The entire score is by Alan Menken.

 "Big Dog" - 3:38
 "Man's Best Friend" - 3:06
 "Atomic Dog" - 4:43
 "Every Dog Has Its Day" - 2:52
 "Somethin' About You" - 3:18
 "Woof! There It Is" - 3:02
 "It's A Dog" - 2:40
 "Tibet" - 2:33
 "First Signs" - 3:00
 "Transformation" - 4:04
 "Magic Lab" - 2:19
 "Breaking Through" - 2:50
 "Kozak Gets A Tail" - 2:34
 "Meditation" - 1:06
 "Escaping the Lab" - 4:42
 "To The Rescue" - 4:54
 "Family Time" - 1:20

Home media
The film was released on DVD on August 1, 2006.

See also
 Felix Salten, the author of the 1923 novel The Hound of Florence, the source material for the 1959 film
 The Shaggy Dog, the original 1959 theatrical film
 The Shaggy D.A., the 1976 theatrical sequel
 The Return of the Shaggy Dog, the 1987 television sequel
 The Shaggy Dog, the 1994 television movie and the first remake of the 1959 film
 Nine Lives, a 2016 family comedy film with a similar premise

References

External links

 
 
 
 
 

2006 films
2006 comedy films
2000s American films
2000s children's comedy films
2000s children's fantasy films
2000s English-language films
2000s fantasy comedy films
American children's comedy films
American children's fantasy films
American fantasy comedy films
Disney film remakes
Films about dogs
Films about dysfunctional families
Films about lawyers
Films about shapeshifting
Films based on adaptations
Films directed by Brian Robbins
Films produced by David Hoberman
Films scored by Alan Menken
Films set in Los Angeles County, California
Mandeville Films films
Remakes of American films
The Shaggy Dog films
Walt Disney Pictures films